ADAM-like, decysin 1 is a protein that in humans is encoded by the ADAMDEC1 gene.

Function

This encoded protein is thought to be a secreted protein belonging to the disintegrin metalloproteinase family. Its expression is upregulated during the maturation of dendritic cells. This protein may play an important role in dendritic cell function and their interactions with germinal center T cells. [provided by RefSeq, Jul 2008].

References

Further reading 

Proteases
EC 3.4.24